Daniel Simpson may refer to:

 Danny Simpson (early footballer) (1896–1903), English footballer
 Daniel R. Simpson (1927–2015), American politician
 Daniel H. Simpson (born 1939), American diplomat
 Daniel Simpson (poet) (born 1952), American poet
 Daniel Léo Simpson (born 1959), American composer
 Danny Simpson (born 1987), English footballer
 Daniel L. Simpson, United States Air Force major general

See also
 Daniela Simpson (born 1976), American businesswoman